These are the official results of the Women's 4 × 400 metres event at the 2003 IAAF World Championships in Paris, France. Their final was held on Sunday 31 August 2003 at 19:10h.

Final

Heats
Held on Saturday 30 August 2003

Heat 1

Heat 2

Heat 3

References
 Results

 
Relays at the World Athletics Championships
2003 in women's athletics